Sala Comacina is a comune (municipality) in the Province of Como in the Italian region Lombardy, located about  north of Milan and about  northeast of Como.

Sala Comacina borders the following municipalities: Colonno, Lezzeno, Ossuccio, Ponna.

Demographic evolution

References

External links
 www.salacomacina.com/

Cities and towns in Lombardy